American University Preparatory School (commonly referred to as AUP) is a private, for-profit, four-year, co-educational boarding and day college preparatory high school for grades 9-12 located in Los Angeles, California, at the center of downtown Los Angeles. Its curricular focus is on Global Studies & Citizenship, Digital Media Arts, Computer Science, Leadership, and Entrepreneurship in the 21st century.

Campus

American University Preparatory School is located in downtown Los Angeles. The school's main facility is located across from the World Trade Center on Figueroa St., and the school partners with surrounding facilities for student usage. Notably, AUP is the academic home to some of the Music Academy students of the Colburn School, and AUP students may attend music classes at the Colburn School.  Students also utilize the Downtown Public Library.

References

University-preparatory schools
High schools in Los Angeles
Private schools in California
Private high schools in California
Boarding schools in California
International high schools
International schools in the United States
Educational institutions established in 2014
2014 establishments in California